Elminster's Ecologies Appendix II: The High Moor / The Serpent Hills is a supplement to the 2nd edition of the Advanced Dungeons & Dragons fantasy role-playing game.

Contents
Elminster's Ecologies Appendix II: The High Moor / The Serpent Hills is a campaign expansion set that contains two booklets which detail the ecologies of two adjacent locations in the Forgotten Realms setting. This is done through the eyes of two non-player characters: Bara, a female druid of the High Moor, describes the flora and fauna of this desolate domain; the Lark of Suzail, a female user with a fear of snakes, explains the Serpent Hills. The geography, weather, plants, and animals of each area are given, as well as details of the various monsters, how they are organized, and what relationships exist between the tribes. The High Moor is populated by a number of humanoid groups, with some trolls, undead, and dragons, while the Serpent Hills are populated by reptilian monsters. The supplement provides encounter tables but no statistics, and each booklet contains a rumors and legends section at the end.

Publication history
Elminster's Ecologies Appendix II: The High Moor / The Serpent Hills was published by TSR, Inc. in 1995.

Reception
Cliff Ramshaw reviewed Elminster's Ecologies Appendix II: The High Moor / The Serpent Hills for Arcane magazine, rating it a 5 out of 10 overall. Ramshaw complains that the two NPC personalities are "enforced on the text" with "crudity", which "makes it heavy going in places, but no less informative for that". He felt that the ruins and dungeons hinted at in the rumors and legends sections, which were left for the referee to fill out, were "all very well", but wondered if "wouldn't it have been better to have more of this sort of thing and less about the different varieties of grass in the area?"

References

Forgotten Realms sourcebooks
Role-playing game supplements introduced in 1995